El Cid is a Spanish historical action drama streaming television series about Rodrigo Díaz de Vivar "El Cid", the 11th-century Castilian knight and warlord. Created by José Velasco and Luiz Arranz for Amazon Prime Video, the series stars Jaime Lorente alongside José Luis García Pérez, Elia Galera, Carlos Bardem, Alicia Sanz and Jaime Olías, among others. The 5-episode first season was released on Prime Video on December 18, 2020, and the 5-episode second season was released on July 15, 2021.

Premise 
Ruy is the son of a low-ranking nobleman who died in the service of Ferdinand, Count of Castile (José Luis García Pérez).

Ferdinand, married to Queen Sancha, has become King of León by defeating in battle Sancha's brother, Bermudo. Bermudo's sister, Sancha, was next in line to the throne, and Ferdinand seized the opportunity to become king after Bermudo's death. Sancha plots with a group of Leonese nobles, notably Flaín, Count of León, and Ruy's grandfather Rodrigo, to overthrow her husband and take the throne that rightfully belongs to her. Sancha is torn between her desire to be queen and her love for her husband. She does not want him harmed, but the nobles have other ideas.

The king's three sons, Sancho, Alfonso, and García are not involved in the plot, but each has his own individual ambitions to succeed his father. Sancha is particularly concerned by the activities of her daughter Urraca, Ferdinand's eldest child, who resents being excluded from the line of succession because she is a woman, despite the fact that she older than Sancho, the king's chosen heir. Urraca's ambition and resentment lead her to stir up trouble in the Royal Court in the hopes of finding any possible means of obtaining power and territory for herself.

Ruy is taken by his grandfather to Ferdinand's court where he eventually becomes squire to Sancho. He is attracted to Jimena, who has been brought to court for an arranged marriage with Count Flain's son Orduño. Ruy soon makes an enemy of Orduño due to their rivalry over Jimena.

Ruy becomes aware of the plot against Ferdinand and realizes that his grandfather Rodrigo is involved. He has to find a way to prove his loyalty by preventing the death of the king (whom he despises) and at the same time avoid implicating his grandfather.

Cast
 Jaime Lorente as Ruy (El Cid) 
  as Jimena
 José Luis García Pérez as Ferdinand, the Great, Count of Castile, King of León
 Elia Galera as Queen Sancha 
  as Infanta Urraca, Ferdinand's eldest child 
  as Sancho, Ferdinand's eldest son
 Lucía Díez as Infanta Elvira, Ferdinand's younger daughter
  as Alfonso, Ferdinand's middle son
 Nicolás Illoro as García, Ferdinand's youngest son
 Ginés García Millán as King Ramiro
 Juan Echanove as Bishop Don Bernardo
 Juan Fernández as Rodrigo, Ruy's grandfather
 Carlos Bardem as Count Flaín of León
 Pablo Álvarez as Orduño, Flaín's son and Ruy's foe
 Alfons Nieto as 
 Sara Vidorreta as Ermesinda
 Rodrigo Poisón as Velarde
  as Maestro Orotz, sword master
 Álvaro Rico as Nuño
  as Alvar, squire
  as Beltrán
 David Castillo as Lisardo, squire
 Ignacio Herráez as Trifon, Ferdinand's champion
 Hamid Krim as Al-Muqtadir
 Zohar Liba as Abu Bakr, Al-Muqtadir's ambassador
 Emilio Buale as Sádaba
  as Amina, Al-Muqtadir and Farah's daughter, sister of Yusuf, half-sister of Mundir, and Ruy's temporary lover
 TBA as Yusuf, Al-Muqtadir and Farah's son, brother of Amina, and half-brother of Mundir
 Adil Koukouh as Mundir, Al-Muqtadir's son by Naadira, half-brother of Amina and Yusuf, and leader of the Syrian vanguard
 Farah Hamed as Naadira, Mundir's mother, Yusuf and Amina's stepmother, and chief wife of Al-Muqtadir
 María Pedroviejo as Farah, Yusuf and Amina's mother, Mundir's stepmother, and concubine of Al-Muqtadir
 Introduced in season 2
 Amparo Alcaraz as Alberta

Episodes

Season 1 (2020)

Season 2 (2021)

Production and release 

Filming began in the province of Soria on 1 October 2019. Shooting locations in the province included Almenar de Soria, Almazán, Calatañazor, Duruelo de la Sierra, and the Montes de Ucero in the Cañón del Río Lobos Natural Park. The Aljafería Palace was used to recreate indoor locations of the Taifa of Zaragoza. Production also moved to province of Teruel (Albarracín) and the Madrid region (including Navalcarnero and Madrid). The five-part first season was released on December 18, 2020, on Prime Video. In January 2021, the confirmation of a second season was reported in media, and a release date for July 15, 2021 was announced in June 2021.

The series' direction crew included Marco A. Castillo, Adolfo Martínez Pérez, Miguel Alcantud, Arantxa Echevarría, Manuel Carballo and Alberto Ruiz Rojo.

Languages
The original languages of El Cid are Spanish and Arabic. The series is also available on Amazon in English, French, Portuguese, German, and other languages.

References

External links 

2020s Spanish drama television series
2020 Spanish television series debuts
Spanish action television series
Spanish-language Amazon Prime Video original programming
Television series about the history of Spain
Television series set in the 11th century
Television series by Amazon Studios
Television shows filmed in Spain
Cultural depictions of El Cid